{{Automatic taxobox
| fossil_range = Late Pliocene to recent
| image = Mastomys.jpg
| image_caption = Southern multimammate mouse (Mastomys coucha)
| taxon = Mastomys
| authority = Thomas, 1915
| type_species = Mus coucha
| subdivision_ranks = Species
| subdivision = Mastomys angolensisMastomys awashensisMastomys couchaMastomys erythroleucusMastomys hubertiMastomys kollmannspergeriMastomys natalensisMastomys shortridgei}}Mastomys is a genus of rodent in the family Muridae endemic to Africa. It contains eight species:
 Angolan multimammate mouse (M. angolensis)
 Awash multimammate mouse or Awash mastomys (M. awashensis)
 Southern multimammate mouse (M. coucha)
 Guinea multimammate mouse (M. erythroleucus)
 Hubert's multimammate mouse (M. huberti)
 Verheyen's multimammate mouse (M. kollmannspergeri)
 Natal multimammate mouse (M. natalensis)
 Shortridge's multimammate mouse (M. shortridgei)

The multimammate mice (also called multimammate rats, African soft-furred rats, natal-rats or African common rats) are found in most parts of sub-Saharan Africa. Mastomys species are omnivorous, and can live up to four years.

Systematically, they were long placed in the genus Rattus (referred to as Rattus natalensis). Later they were placed in the genus Mus (referred to as Mus natalensis) and then they were placed in the genus Praomys. Today, molecular research has discovered that they are a genus of their own (Mastomys) and that they are closely related to Praomys. They are also more closely related to Mus than to Rattus. The dwarf multimammate mouse (Serengetimys  pernanus) was formerly classified in this genus, but has now been moved to its own genus.

References

Further reading
Musser, G. G. and M. D. Carleton. 2005. Superfamily Muroidea. pp. 894–1531 in Mammal Species of the World, a Taxonomic and Geographic Reference''. D. E. Wilson and D. M. Reeder eds. Johns Hopkins University Press, Baltimore.

 
Rodents of Africa
Rodent genera
Taxa named by Oldfield Thomas
Taxonomy articles created by Polbot